San Estanislao de Kostka is a town and municipality located in the Bolívar Department, northern Colombia.

San Estanislao is also informally known as Arenal by the locals, Arenal is Spanish for "sand", which earned its nickname in result that the town accumulates high amounts of sand during rain and wind.  A mission was established on the present site in 1650.  Access to the town can be challenging as the roads that access the town are unpaved and often water-logged after long periods of rain. Inhabitants of San Estanislao generally support themselves through family farms yielding a variety of produce and meat products from the cattle as well as poultry and pork and some of the best dairy products and a local cheese called "queso costeno" when translated means cheese of the coast all of which are shared and traded amongst themselves. "Costenos" which the people of San Estanislao often call themselves are hard working men and women who're humble in every aspect of life.

SPORTS.
       San Estanislao "Arenal" as known by the locals are some of the biggest baseball fans around the local team "Los Tigres de Arenal" are a big deal to the locals in the area and the kids love to meet the players who often host baseball camps for the kids. Of course another one of the countries and one of the world's most popular sport soccer is always the go to sport and is played from the grass fields to the dirt and concrete roads of San Estanislao.

Location 
San Estanislao is located alongside the northeastern side of the Dique Canal 16 meters (55 feet) above sea level. Nearest major metropolitan municipalities are Barranquilla to the north by northeast, and Cartagena to the west. The town of Soplaviento is located across the canal from San Estanislao.

Population 
16,518

Climate 
The average temperature is approximately 35.0'C (95.0'F) during the day, 23.9'C (75.0'F) at night, and is generally the same most of the calendar year.

References 

Municipalities of Bolívar Department